Güdülge is a village in the Kâhta District, Adıyaman Province, Turkey. The village is populated by Kurds of the Gewozî tribe and had a population of 53 in 2021.

The hamlets of Bayramlar, Karakoç and Karamağara are attached to Güdülge.

References

Villages in Kâhta District
Kurdish settlements in Adıyaman Province